Trechus fulvus is a species of ground beetle in the Trechinae subfamily.

Description
The upper body is yellowish-black. That is common from southwest Norway to British Isles. That can be found in Ireland's Carnlough, Antrim area.

Ecology
Trechus fulvus lives under stones in rocky seaside environment.

References

Beetles described in 1831
fulvus